Abbie Ives (born October 7, 1998) is an American ice hockey goaltender, currently playing with the Connecticut Whale in the Premier Hockey Federation (PHF).

Career 
Across 102 games with Quinnipiac, Ives would finish with 14 shutouts, third all-time for the university. During her first year with the university, she served as the team's backup behind Sydney Rossman, and would take over the starting position after Rossman's graduation in 2017. In her final season, she would serve as an assistant captain for the team, and would be named the team's MVP.

In May 2020, she signed her first professional contract with Connecticut in the PHF. She picked up her first career professional win in the Whale's opening game of the 2020–21 NWHL season, making 24 saves in a 2–1 victory over the Buffalo Beauts.

Personal life 
Her father is a Presbyterian minister, and her mother is a pediatric dentist.

References

External links 

American women's ice hockey goaltenders
Connecticut Whale (PHF) players
1998 births
Living people
21st-century American women
Quinnipiac Bobcats women's ice hockey players
People from Bedford Hills, New York
Ice hockey players from New York (state)